Tebogo Sosome (born 27 August 1987) is a Botswanan football defender who currently plays for Jwaneng Galaxy.

References

1987 births
Living people
Botswana footballers
Botswana international footballers
Gaborone United S.C. players
Jwaneng Galaxy F.C. players
Association football defenders